The Bendix G-15 is a computer introduced in 1956 by the Bendix Corporation, Computer Division, Los Angeles, California. The G-15 has a drum memory of 2,160 29-bit words, along with 20 words used for special purposes and rapid-access storage.
The base system, without peripherals, cost $49,500. A working model cost around  $60,000 (over $500,000 by today's standards). It could also be rented for $1,485 per month.  It was meant for scientific and industrial markets.  The series was gradually discontinued when Control Data Corporation took over the Bendix computer division in 1963.

The chief designer of the G-15 was Harry Huskey, who had worked with Alan Turing on the ACE in the United Kingdom and on the SWAC in the 1950s. He made most of the design while working as a professor at Berkeley, and other universities.  David C. Evans was one of the Bendix engineers on the G-15 project.  He would later become famous for his work in computer graphics and for starting up Evans & Sutherland with Ivan Sutherland.

Architecture
The G-15 was inspired by the Automatic Computing Engine (ACE).  It is a serial-architecture machine, in which the main memory is a magnetic drum.  It uses the drum as a recirculating delay-line memory, in contrast to the analog delay line implementation in other serial designs. Each track has a set of read and write heads; as soon as a bit was read off a track, it is re-written on the same track a certain distance away. The length of delay, and thus the number of words on a track, is determined by the spacing of the read and write heads, the delay corresponding to the time required for a section of the drum to travel from the write head to the corresponding read head. Under normal operation, data are written back without change, but this data flow can be intercepted at any time, allowing the machine to update sections of a track as needed.

This arrangement allows the designers to create "delay lines" of any desired length. In addition to the twenty "long lines" of 108 words each, there are four more short lines of four words each. These short lines recycle at 27 times the rate of the long lines, allowing fast access to frequently needed data. Even the machine's accumulators are implemented as drum lines: three double-word lines are used for intermediate storage and double-precision addition, multiplication, and division in addition to a one single-word accumulator. This use of the drum rather than flip-flops for the registers helped to reduce vacuum tube count.

A consequence of this design was that, unlike other computers with magnetic drums, the G-15 does not retain its memory when it is shut off. The only permanent tracks are two timing tracks recorded on the drum at the factory. The second track is a backup, as the tracks are liable to erasure if one of their amplifier tubes shorted out.

The serial nature of the G-15's memory was carried over into the design of its arithmetic and control circuits. The adders work on one binary digit at a time, and even the instruction word was designed to minimize the number of bits in an instruction that needed to be retained in flip-flops (to the extent of leveraging another one-word drum line used exclusively for generating address timing signals).

The G-15 has 180 vacuum tube packs and 3000 germanium diodes.  It has a total of about 450 tubes (mostly dual triodes). Its magnetic drum memory holds 2,160 words of twenty-nine bits.  Average memory access time is 14.5 milliseconds, but its instruction addressing architecture can reduce this dramatically for well-written programs. Its addition time is 270 microseconds (not counting memory access time).  Single-precision multiplication takes 2,439 microseconds and double-precision multiplication takes 16,700 microseconds.

Peripherals 
One of the G-15's primary output devices is the typewriter with an output speed of about 10 characters per second for numbers (and lower-case hexadecimal characters u-z) and about three characters per second for alphabetical characters. The machine's limited storage precludes much output of anything but numbers; occasionally, paper forms with pre-printed fields or labels were inserted into the typewriter. A faster typewriter unit was also available.

The high-speed photoelectric paper tape reader (250 hexadecimal digits per second on five-channel paper tape for the PR-1; 400 characters from 5-8 channel tape for the PR-2) read programs (and occasionally saved data) from tapes that were often mounted in cartridges for easy loading and unloading. Not unlike magnetic tape, the paper tape data are blocked into runs of 108 words or less since that is the maximum read size. A cartridge can contain many multiple blocks, up to 2500 words (~10 kilobytes).

While there is an optional high-speed paper tape punch (the PTP-1 at 60 digits per second) for output, the standard punch operates at 17 hex characters per second (510 bytes per minute).

Optionally, the AN-1 "Universal Code Accessory" included the "35-4" Friden Flexowriter and HSR-8 paper tape reader and HSP-8 paper tape punch. The mechanical reader and punch can process paper tapes up to eight channels wide at 110 characters per second.

The CA-1 "Punched Card Coupler" can connect one or two IBM 026 card punches (which were more often used as manual devices) to read cards at 17 columns per second (approximately 12 full cards per minute) or punch cards at 11 columns per second (approximately 8 full cards per minute). Partially full cards were processed more quickly with an 80-column-per-second skip speed). The more expensive CA-2 Punched Card Coupler reads and punches cards at a 100-card-per-minute rate.

The PA-3 pen plotter runs at 1 inch per second with 200 increments per inch on a paper roll 1 foot wide by 100 feet long. The optional retractable pen-holder eliminates "retrace lines".

The MTA-2 can interface up to four drives for half-inch Mylar magnetic tapes, which can store as many as 300,000 words (in blocks no longer than 108 words). The read/write rate is 430 hexadecimal digits per second; the bidirectional search speed is 2500 characters per second.

The DA-1 differential analyzer facilitates solution of differential equations. It contains 108 integrators and 108 constant multipliers, sporting 34 updates per second.

Software 
A problem peculiar to machines with serial memory is the latency of the storage medium: instructions and data are not always immediately available and, in the worst case, the machine must wait for the complete recirculation of a delay line to obtain data from a given memory address. The problem is addressed in the G-15 by what the Bendix literature calls "minimum-access coding". Each instruction carries with it the address of the next instruction to be executed, allowing the programmer to arrange instructions such that when one instruction completes, the next instruction is about to appear under the read head for its line. Data can be staggered in a similar manner. To aid this process, the coding sheets include a table containing numbers of all addresses; the programmer can cross off each address as it is used. Bendix has an operating system of the same name. 

A symbolic assembler, similar to the IBM 650's Symbolic Optimal Assembly Program (SOAP), was introduced in the late 1950s and includes routines for minimum-access coding. Other programming aids include a supervisor program, a floating-point interpretive system named "Intercom", and ALGO, an algebraic language designed from the 1958 Preliminary Report of the ALGOL committee. Users also developed their own tools, and a variant of Intercom suited to the needs of civil engineers is said to have circulated.

Floating-point arithmetic is implemented in software. The "Intercom" series of languages provide an easier to program virtual machine that operates in floating point. Instructions to Intercom 500, 550, and 1000 are numerical, six or seven digits in length. Instructions are stored sequentially; the beauty is convenience, not speed. Intercom 1000 even has an optional double-precision version.

As mentioned above the machine uses hexadecimal numbers, but the user never has to deal with this in normal programming. The user programs use the decimal numbers while the OS resides in the higher addresses.

Significance
The G-15 is sometimes described as the first personal computer, because it has the Intercom interpretive system.  The title is disputed by other machines, such as the LINC and the PDP-8, and some maintain that only microcomputers, such as those which appeared in the 1970s, can be called personal computers. Nevertheless, the machine's low acquisition and operating costs, and the fact that it does not require a dedicated operator, meant that organizations could allow users complete access to the machine.

Over 400 G-15s were manufactured. About 300 G-15s were installed in the United States and a few were sold in other countries such as Australia and Canada. The machine found a niche in civil engineering, where it was used to solve cut and fill problems.  Some have survived and have made their way to computer museums or science and technology museums around the world.

Huskey received one of the last production G15s, fitted with a gold-plated front panel.

This was the first computer that Ken Thompson ever used.

A Bendix G-15 was used at Fremont High School (Oakland Unified School District) in the 1964-65 school year for the senior seminar math class. Students were taught the fundamentals of programming. One such exercise was the calculation of a square root using the method of Newtonian approximation. A Bendix G-15 was still in use for the UC Berkeley extension summer class in programming, at Oakland Technical High School, in 1970.

See also
List of vacuum tube computers
Bendix G-20

References

External links
 The Bendix G-15
 Bendix G15 computer
 Another G-15 reference
 Bendix G-15 documentation
 photo
 info page with photo
 Describes Harry Huskey's involvement with ACE
 Extensive G15 site list, photos & technical info

1950s computers
Vacuum tube computers
Minicomputers
Computer-related introductions in 1956
Science and technology in Greater Los Angeles
1956 in California
Serial computers
Bendix Corporation